Clare Teal (born 14 May 1973) is an English singer and broadcaster who has become famous not only for her singing, but also for having signed the biggest recording contract by a British jazz singer.

Biography
Teal was brought up in the Kildwick area of Yorkshire. She developed an interest in jazz from an early age, through her father's collection of 78rpm records, becoming "obsessed" with big band singers like Ella Fitzgerald and big bands like Joe Loss. She took music lessons, first on the electronic organ, then more formally on clarinet, before studying music at Wolverhampton University. While at university, Teal found herself without a clarinet for an unexpected examination. Deciding to sing instead, she not only got her "best grades ever", but discovered that she loved singing in public. After graduation, she started a career in advertising, singing in her spare time with amateur and semi-professional bands.

Career
Teal's break came when she was asked to stand in for Stacey Kent at a weekend festival in Llandrindod Wells. This led (after some determined self-promotion, in which she drew upon her advertising skills) to a three-album contract with the jazz label Candid Records. Her popularity soared, with appearances on radio and television bringing her to the attention of a wider public, and in 2004 she released her first album for Sony Jazz in what was the biggest recording deal by any British jazz singer. Don't Talk topped the jazz charts and entered the UK Top 20 UK Albums Chart.

While the majority of her recordings are cover versions of standards, her albums feature original songs and contemporary cover versions, notably a cover of "California Dreaming" by The Mamas & the Papas. This song attracted the attention of BBC Radio presenter Michael Parkinson, garnering significant publicity during her period with Candid Records.

Teal has toured throughout the UK and the world, with her pianist, trio, mini big band, or Hollywood Orchestra. She has worked with the Hallé Orchestra, BBC Concert Orchestra, RTÉ Concert Orchestra, and the John Wilson Orchestra as well as other top big bands. In August 2017, she produced and presented her third concert for The Proms. Swing No End  featured two big bands and many special guests. It was broadcast on BBC Radio 2, BBC Radio 3, and televised on BBC Four.

From 2006 to 2013 Teal presented the BBC Radio 2 show, Big Band Special. In 2009 she started presenting her own show on BBC Radio 2. She has appeared as a presenter on Friday Night is Music Night. Since 2 August 2009, she has presented Sunday Night at 10, took over from Malcolm Laycock. She writes a weekly blog for The Yorkshire Post.

Her final show for BBC Radio 2 was broadcast on Sunday 3 January 2021.  From Sunday 24 January 2021 she has joined Jazz FM for a new two-hour swing and big band show.

Teal collaborated with Van Morrison on the single "Carrying a Torch" from his album Duets: Reworking the Catalogue. She was the opening act for Liza Minnelli at Kenwood House and the Royal Festival Hall. She performed at the Glastonbury Festival and the Marlborough Jazz Festival.

Personal life
Teal lives in Glastonbury with her girlfriend Amanda Field, having lived in Bath for many years. In 2007, she said that, although she had lived in Bath for more than a decade, she still feels like a Northerner, saying she is "never not from Yorkshire".

Awards and honours
 British Jazz Vocalist of the Year, 2005, 2007,2015 and 2017
 BBC Jazz Vocalist of the Year, 2006
 Arts & Entertainment Personality of the Year, 2004, 2011
 Gold Badge, British Academy of Songwriters, Composers and Authors, 2011

Discography
 Nice Work (1995)
 That's the Way It Is (Candid, 2001)
 Orsino's Songs (Candid, 2002)
 The Road Less Travelled (Candid, 2003)
 Don't Talk (Sony, 2004)
 Paradisi Carousel (Sony, 2007)
 Get Happy (Universal, 2008)
 Live at Ebenezer Chapel (Ebenezer, 2009)
 Hey Ho (Mud, 2011)
 And So It Goes with Grant Windsor (Mud, 2013)
 In Good Company with Grant Windsor, Pee Wee Ellis (Mud, 2014)
 At Your Request (Mud, 2015)
 A Tribute to Ella Fitzgerald (Chasing the Dragon, 2016)

References

External links
Official website
The Clare Teal Show on Jazz FM

1973 births
Living people
Alumni of the University of Wolverhampton
BBC Radio 2 presenters
English jazz singers
British women jazz singers
Lesbian singers
English lesbian musicians
English LGBT singers
Musicians from Yorkshire
People from Craven District
21st-century English women singers
British women radio presenters
21st-century English LGBT people